Robin Reisig is an American journalist and journalism professor. A graduate of Wellesley College and the Columbia University Graduate School of Journalism,  she is a lecturer at the Columbia School of Journalism and a visiting faculty at the Asian College of Journalism.

Prior to attending Columbia, Robin Reisig worked in Alabama as a reporter covering the civil rights movement. She followed this with work for The Village Voice and The Washington Post where she covered activism, the liberal movement, and women's rights. While at The Washington Post, she also covered the Maryland suburbs.

She worked at New York Newsday for several years as assistant features editor and op-ed editor. She left Newsday following the closing of the New York City edition. Reisig then started teaching at Columbia, where she teaches "Reporting and Writing One". She has freelanced for a variety of publications.

In April 2006 she was awarded a distinguished alumni award by the J-School Alumni Association.  This is the highest honor awarded by the Alumni Association.

In May 2007 she was selected as Teacher of Year by the student body and Columbia's Society of Professional Journalists chapter, which serves as the student government.

References 

Year of birth missing (living people)
Living people
American women journalists
Columbia University Graduate School of Journalism alumni
Columbia University faculty
Wellesley College alumni
American women academics
21st-century American women